Piparpanti is a village in the western part of Barhara block of Bhojpur district in Bihar, India. As of 2011, its population was 3,697, in 505 households.

References 

Villages in Bhojpur district, India